This is a list of women writers who were born in Afghanistan or whose writings are closely associated with that country.

A 
 Atia Abawi (born 1982), American author and television journalist of Afghan descent
 Lina AbiRafeh, Arab-American (non-Afghan) author of Gender and International Aid in Afghanistan
 Muqadasa Ahmadzai (born 1992/1993), poet, social activist, and politician  
 Soraya Alekozei (born 1955), Afghan-born memoirist, interpreter, and veteran, based in Germany
 Najwa Alimi, journalist, humanitarian
 Shakaiba Sanga Amaj (1986–2007), assassinated journalist
 Zarghona Anaa (?–1772), poet
 Nadia Anjuman (1980–2005), poet
 Asma Rasmya (1877–?), editor, school principal, and feminist
 Najiba Ayubi journalist and activist

B 
 Fevziye Rahgozar Barlas (born 1955), poet, and short story writer
 Babo Jan (fl. 1880), Afghan royal consort and poet
 Basira Joya (c.2001) news anchor for Zan TV and Ariana Television Network

D 
 Maryam Durani (born 1987), activist, journalist, 
 Ayesha Durrani (18th-century), poet

E 
 Zohre Esmaeli (born 1985), author, model, and designer, based in Berlin

F 
 Wahida Faizi (born 1994), journalist
 Khalida Furugh (born 1972), poet and academic

H 
 Chékéba Hachemi (born 1974), writer and diplomat
 Rangina Hamidi (born 1978), writer, educator, social activist and politician 
 Nadia Hashimi (born 1977), Afghan-American novelist and pediatrician

J 
 Malalai Joya (born 1978), activist, writer, and a politician

K 

 Fowzia Karimi author and illustrator
 Fawzia Koofi (born 1975) politician, memoirist and women's rights activist

M 
 Maryam Mahboob (born 1955), author known for her writing on Afghan patriarchy and migrants
 Farzana Marie (born 1983 or 1984) American writer and Dari translator
 Saeeda Mahmood, journalist
 Horia Mosadiq, journalist, activist, and political analyst

N 
 Fariba Nawa (born 1973), Afghan-born American freelance journalist

Q 
 Homeira Qaderi (born 1980), writer, activist and educator

P 
 Parween Pazhwak (born 1967), writer, poet, activist

R 
 Fatima Rahimi (born 1992), Afghan-born Czech journalist and radio presenter 
 Layla Sarahat Rushani (1952/1954–2004), Afghan-born poet, lived in Netherlands

S 
 Sana Safi (born 1989), broadcast journalist
 Saira Shah, British of Afghan-descent author, reporter and documentary filmmaker
 Sahira Sharif, politician and founder of literary society Mirman Baheer 
 Nafeesa Shayeq, journalist, feminist

T 
 Nazo Tokhi (1651–1717), writer and poet

W 
 Shaista Wahab, writer in Dari, librarian, and professor

Y 
 Sakena Yacoobi (born 1949/1950), writer, and activist
 Elham Yaghoubian, writer, politician
 Gaisu Yari, human rights activist, women's rights activist, writer, blogger, and speaker
 Malala Yousafzai (born 1997) activist and author of I Am Malala

Z 
 Zakia Zaki (c. 1972–2007), journalist
 Spôjmaï Zariâb (born 1949/1952), short story writer
 Maliha Zulfacar (born 1961), writer, professor, and was the ambassador of Afghanistan to Germany from 2006 to 2010.

See also
List of Afghan women journalists
List of women writers

-
Afghan women writers, List of
Writers
Women writers, List of Afghan